Frank Jewett (April 4, 1917 – June 28, 1986) was an American sailor. He competed in the O-Jolle event at the 1936 Summer Olympics.  He graduated from California Institute of Technology and Harvard Business School.

References

External links
 

1917 births
1986 deaths
American male sailors (sport)
Olympic sailors of the United States
Sailors at the 1936 Summer Olympics – O-Jolle
Sportspeople from New York City
California Institute of Technology alumni
Harvard Business School alumni